Sajid Manzil (born 20 April 1984) is an Indian-born cricketer who plays for the Kuwait national cricket team. He played in the 2013 ICC World Cricket League Division Six tournament.

References

External links
 

1984 births
Living people
Kuwaiti cricketers
Indian emigrants to Kuwait
Indian expatriates in Kuwait
Place of birth missing (living people)